Pseudobithynia is a genus of freshwater snails with an operculum, aquatic prosobranch gastropod mollusks in the family Bithyniidae.

Species
Species in the genus Pseudobithynia include:
 Pseudobithynia ambrakis Glöer, Falniowski & Pešić, 2010
 Pseudobithynia amiqensis Glöer & Bößneck, 2007
 Pseudobithynia euboeensis Glöer, Falniowski & Pešić, 2010
 Pseudobithynia falniowskii Glöer & Pešić, 2006
 Pseudobithynia gittenbergeri Glöer & Maassen, 2009
 Pseudobithynia hemmeni Glöer & Maassen, 2009
 Pseudobithynia irana Glöer & Pešić, 2006 - type species
 Pseudobithynia kathrinae Glöer & Bößneck, 2007
 Pseudobithynia kirka (Glöer, Albrecht & Wilke, 2007)
 Pseudobithynia levantica Glöer & Bößneck, 2007
 Pseudobithynia panetolis (Glöer, Albrecht & Wilke, 2007)
 Pseudobithynia pentheri (Sturany, 1904)
 Pseudobithynia renei (Letourneux, 1887)
 Pseudobithynia trichonis (Glöer, Albrecht & Wilke, 2007)
 Pseudobithynia westerlundii Glöer & Pešić, 2006
 Pseudobithynia zogari Glöer, Falniowski & Pešić, 2010

References

Bithyniidae